The 1935 Railway Cup Hurling Championship was the ninth staging of the Railway Cup since its establishment by the Gaelic Athletic Association in 1927. The cup began on 24 February 1935 and ended on 17 March 1935.

Munster were the defending champions.

On 17 March 1935, Munster won the cup following a 3–04 to 3–00 defeat of Leinster in the final at Croke Park. This was their sixth Railway Cup title overall and their first second title in succession.

Results

Semi-final

Final

Top scorers

Top scorers overall

Bibliography

 Donegan, Des, The Complete Handbook of Gaelic Games (DBA Publications Limited, 2005).

References

Railway Cup Hurling Championship
Railway Cup Hurling Championship